Doug Hall is Founder & Chairman of Eureka! Ranch International. He is a lecturer, best-selling author, tv and radio host, and is a chemical engineer by education. He was Master Marketing Inventor at Procter & Gamble - shipping a record 9 products in 12 months. For his pioneering work turning innovation from an art into a science Hall was awarded a Doctor of Laws from the University of Prince Edward Island and a Doctor of Engineering from the University of Maine.

Eureka! Ranch International 

Hall founded Eureka! Ranch in 1986. Originally designed as a "think tank for hire", the Ranch worked primarily with Fortune 100/500 companies looking for new product ideas. The Ranch partnered with the University of Maine in 2005 with the founding of a new field of study called Innovation Engineering. Designed as a system based on the principles of W. Edwards Deming and the Quality Movement, it consists of 48 skills designed to instill a mindset of never-ending innovation.

The 48 skills are the foundation for both the academic system and corporate consulting, with students graduating and private industry customers completing Black Belt Certification to mark mastery of the 48 skills.

Eureka! Ranch claims to separate themselves from other "innovation consultants" based on the following elements:
 Delivery of a complete system for innovation, from creation to commercialization
 Continuous improvement of tools and systems as the only major innovation firm investing in new research and development
 Practical tools proven by data; designed to be understood by everyone and powerful enough to be trusted by anyone
 Insistence on meaningful uniqueness; Eureka! Ranch classifies an innovation as only those ideas that both have additional meaning to someone's life and being new to the world
 Entrepreneurial approach; a focus on empowering individuals creates opportunities for collaboration and fun.

Merwyn Technology 
The R&D team of Eureka Ranch have developed an AI system called Merwyn Technology. This system is used to evaluate abstract ideas before additional effort is used to substantiate it.  The system was named after Hall's father Merwyn Bradford Hall, who always hated the name Merwyn.

Published books 
 Jump Start Your Brain (Clerisy Press, 2010)
 Maverick Mindset with David Wecker (Simon & Schuster, 1997)
 Jump Start Your BUSINESS Brain (Emmis Books, 2001)
 Jump Start Your MARKETING Brain (Clerisy Press, 2010)
 North Pole Tenderfoot: A Rookie Goes on a North Pole Expedition Following In Admiral Peary's Footsteps (Clerisy Press, 2009)
Driving Eureka!: Problem Solving with Data Driven Methods and the Innovation Engineering System (Clerisy Press, 2018).

Magazine Columns & Articles 
 Jump Start Your Business; Spend 48 sleepless hours with America's top new-product idea man. at Inc. Magazine
 The Idea Guru at Inc. Magazine
 Innovation Nation at Entrepreneur
 Q&A: American Inventor Judge Doug Hall at Entrepreneur
 Take It In for a Tuneup; A marketing change could put the wind back in your sales. at Entrepreneur
 I've Got an Idea!; You can get one, too, if you just learn to brainstorm a little more like Doug Hall. at Entrepreneur
  at Cincinnati Magazine
 Dubyak, Hall feted by Maine Development Foundation at MaineBiz
 Getting schooled | Applying the methods of UMaine's star innovator to the system's quest for greater relevance in the work force at MaineBiz
 Innovation expertise | UMaine readies for Doug Hall's creativity-based curriculum at MaineBiz.

Newspaper Articles 
 A Buyer’s Guide to Inventions, in Plain English at The New York Times
 Event explores how UMS can adapt to needs at Portland Press Herald
 Innovation Engineering expert commits to UM at Bangor Daily News
 Bowdoin manufacturer honored with award for innovation, global leadership at Bangor Daily News
 Engineering's 'fail fast, fail cheap' model has place in education at Portland Press Herald
 Increase your rate of success at USA Today
 Barefoot Guru at Business Courier
 Eureka Ranch offering new innovation sessions at Business Courier.

References

External links

 Doug Hall's blog and home page
 Eureka! Ranch's home page
 Innovation Engineering's home page

American inventors
Participants in American reality television series
Living people
Year of birth missing (living people)